Yamudiki Mogudu is a 1988 Indian Telugu-language fantasy film, directed by Ravi Raja Pinisetty, starring Chiranjeevi,  Vijayashanti, Radha and Kota Srinivasa Rao. In 1991, the film was dubbed in Hindi as Chiranjeevi. The film was remade in Tamil as Athisaya Piravi (1990). The film was a major commercial success.

Plot
Kaali is a small town goon who helps his neighbourhood with his earnings. He is good at heart and is loved by everyone in town. He works for Kotayya, whose rival is Gollapudi.. Once, when he goes to warn Gollapudi, he meets and falls in love with Radha, Gollapudi's daughter. When they decide to marry even without Gollapudi's consent, he gets Kaali killed in an accident and Kaali goes to hell.

There, he challenges Yama that he was brought wrongly and catches Chitragupta red-handed for cheating. To correct the mistake, Yama and Chitragupta leave for Earth to find Kaali's body so he can return to Earth. Unfortunately Kaali's body has been cremated and Kaali refuses to enter another body. However, Yama and Chitragupta convince him to enter into the body of a person that is identical to him. Kaali refuses, taking heed to a warning by Vichitragupta. They then show him Balu in a village and tell him it is his last option.

Kaali learns that Balu was a soft-spoken and non-confrontational man who was often ill-treated by his family. Vijayashanti is his love interest. Balu's relatives plan to kill him on his 25th birthday as they have to hand over his property. This is when Kaali's soul is put into Balu's body and he plays black and blue with them. However, he remembers his own life once he sees Kotayya's photo in a newspaper and returns to the city. The rest of the plot is woven on how he balances the two lives and two girls, until Yama sees his determination and willingness to save all the people he loves.

Cast
 Chiranjeevi as Kaali & Balu 
 Vijayashanti as Vijayashanti 
 Radha as Radha 
 Rao Gopala Rao
 Kaikala Satyanarayana as Yamadharmaraja
 Kota Srinivasa Rao as Kotayya
 Gollapudi Maruti Rao as Gollapudi
 Allu Rama Lingaiah as Chitragupta
 Prasad Babu
 Sudhakar
 Hariprasad
 Ambika as Dancer

Soundtrack 
The music was composed by Raj–Koti and released by Aditya Music. All lyrics were penned by Veturi.

References

External links
 

1980s fantasy comedy films
1980s Telugu-language films
1988 films
1988 romantic comedy films
Films about reincarnation
Films directed by Ravi Raja Pinisetty
Films scored by Raj–Koti
Indian fantasy comedy films
Indian religious comedy films
Indian romantic comedy films
Telugu films remade in other languages
Yama in popular culture